Mun Yu-ra (Korean: 문유라; born 13 May 1990 in Gyeonggi, South Korea) is a South Korean weightlifter. She competed at the 2012 Summer Olympics in the -69 kg event.

References 

1990 births
Living people
South Korean female weightlifters
Olympic weightlifters of South Korea
Weightlifters at the 2012 Summer Olympics
Weightlifters at the 2010 Asian Games
Universiade medalists in weightlifting
Weightlifters at the 2018 Asian Games
Asian Games medalists in weightlifting
Medalists at the 2018 Asian Games
Asian Games bronze medalists for South Korea
Universiade silver medalists for South Korea
Medalists at the 2011 Summer Universiade
Sportspeople from Gyeonggi Province
20th-century South Korean women
21st-century South Korean women